Rhythm Pals is a Canadian music television series which aired on CBC Television in 1956.

Premise
This Vancouver-produced series featured The Rhythm Pals, a Country/Western vocal/instrumental group formed in 1946 by Mike Ferbey, Marc Wald, and Jack Jensen. They were later known for their regular appearances on The Tommy Hunter Show which aired over the CBC television network from Toronto on Friday evenings.

Scheduling
This series occupied a 20-minute time slot on Mondays at 7:40 p.m. (Eastern time) from 16 April to 20 August 1956. This unusual start time allowed for the 10-minute The Nation's Business political telecasts at 7:30 p.m..

References

External links
 
 Entry at thecanadianencyclopedia.ca
 
 

CBC Television original programming
1950s Canadian music television series
1956 Canadian television series debuts
1956 Canadian television series endings
Black-and-white Canadian television shows